Tampawaddy or Tamrawati(also spelt Tampavatī, Sanskrit: ताम्बावती Taambavatee) is a classical name of the city of Bagan (Pagan), Myanmar. According to the Burmese chronicles, King Thaik Taing (r. 516–523) moved the palace from Thiri Pyissaya to nearby Tampawaddy. However, evidence indicates that  the earliest human settlement in the Bagan region dates only from the mid-7th century CE.

References

Bibliography
 
 

Bagan